Schleswig-Holstein-Sonderburg-Glücksburg was a line of the house of Schleswig-Holstein-Sonderburg, a cadet branch of the House of Oldenburg, from 1622 to 1779.

History 
The line was founded by the partitioned-off duke Philip of Schleswig-Holstein-Sonderburg-Glücksburg (1584–1663). The line was named after Glücksburg Castle, where he had his headquarters.

Members of this line bore the title of Duke of Schleswig-Holstein-Sonderburg-Glücksburg. However, they had limited powers in ruling their territory, since it was not an estate of the Realm, but a fief of the Duchy of Holstein-Gottorp. Later, the family gave up these rights altogether and continued as titular dukes.

Some years after the death of the last duke, Frederick Henry William (1747–1779), the title went via King Frederick VI to Frederick William of Schleswig-Holstein-Sonderburg-Beck, who founded the younger line of Schleswig-Holstein-Sonderburg-Glücksburg in 1825.

Dukes

See also 
 Schleswig-Holstein-Sonderburg
 House of Oldenburg
 Schleswig-Holstein-Sonderburg-Glücksburg (younger line)

External links 
 
 Official website of Schloss Glücksburg

German noble families
Sonderburg-Glucksburg (elder line)

1622 establishments in the Holy Roman Empire